The Great American Cowboy is a 1973 documentary film about the sport of rodeo. The film, which was directed by Kieth Merrill, is notable for its use of experimental editing and camera techniques.  The film focuses on the 1973 battle for the Rodeo Cowboys Association (RCA) all-around world championship race between seasoned veteran rodeo star Larry Mahan and more recent champion Phil Lyne. Voiceover narration is provided by Hollywood actor Joel McCrea. The film won the 1974 Academy Award for Best Documentary Feature.

See also
 List of American films of 1973
 Amazon-the 1997 short film that earned Merrill his second Oscar nomination

References

External links
The Great American Cowboy at the Internet Movie Database

Douglas Kent Hall official Web site
An interview with Keith Merrill about the making of the film 

1973 films
American sports documentary films
Best Documentary Feature Academy Award winners
Films directed by Kieth Merrill
1973 documentary films
Rodeo in film
Cowboy culture
1970s English-language films
1970s American films